Chinmoy Chattopadhyay  (Bengali: চিন্ময় চট্টোপাধ্যায়; also Chinmoy Chatterjee; 7 October 1930 – 26 July 1987) was a Bengali singer primarily known for singing Rabindrasangeet songs. He is widely considered one of the greatest exponents of Rabindrasangeet.

Life and career 
Chinmoy Chattopadhyay was born in 1930 Panihati in Bengal, India. His father was Narendranath Chattopadhyay. He passed Matriculation from Tirthapati Institution in Calcutta and BA from Ashutosh College, West Bengal, India.

Vishmadev Chattopadhyay was an eminent vocal artist in Indian Classical Music, a revered Guru (আচার্য্য or Ustad) in the Delhi Gharana of the vocal classical genre, and a music director in Bengali Film Industry in its early era.

When Chinmoy Chattopadhyay was a student, one day he had the opportunity to see a program of Vishmadev Chattopadhyay, one of the leading classical singer of India. Vishmadev Chattopadhyay's house was then in North Calcutta. Chinmoy went with some friends to watch the show. Vishmadev Chattopadhyay asked, "You have come here to listen to music, do you know any music?" Pushing the silent Chinmoy, his friends started saying, "you know the song! Tell him?"

On hearing this, Vishmadev Babu requested Chinmoy to sing a song. Chinmoy sang a song using Tanpura. Bhishmadev Babu had tears in his eyes after being stunned for a while. Said, "Will you learn music?" At his words, Chinmoy got the great opportunity. The next day Vishmadev Chattopadhyay himself went to Chinmoy's house. Bhishmadev Chattopadhyay himself told Chinmoy's father that day that he would teach Chinmoy music, as well as continue study.

His first song to be sung on Akashvani was probably  'তুমি ডাক দিয়েছ কোন সকালে' . After auditioning on Chinmoy Radio with confidence, he knew very well that he would be accepted. Not only that, he was once a regular artist in Akashvani.

His first record in college life was released in 78 rpm disc record by H M V in 1954. . "Tumi Sandhyar Meghmala" and "Aji Bijan Ghare" on the disc, the song stirred the audience.

Chinmoy Chattopadhyay took training on classical music (vocal) from Bhishmadev Chattopadhyay for about twelve consecutive years. He used to sing in Akashvani from the age of only nineteen.

He started singing Rabindrasangeet songs in the 1950s. He stood out among other stalwarts like Hemanta Mukhopadhyay and Debabrata Biswas and became extremely popular due to his melodious voice. He recorded more than 150 Rabindrasangeet songs and was a regular fixture on All India Radio's programs on Rabindrasangeet.

He died on 26 July 1987, at the age of 57, due to liver ailments.

In the Rabindra Sarobar area of Kolkata, the Russa Road East 2nd Lane, north of the Tollygunge Metro station, was rechristened as the Chinmoy Chatterjee Sarani after him. His residential address is 84, Chinmoy Chatterjee Sarani, Kolkata

Discography 

Chinmoy Chattopadhyay sang many Rabindrasangeet which were widely released during his lifetime as well as after his death.

References 

1930 births
1987 deaths
Rabindra Sangeet exponents
Bengali singers
20th-century Indian singers
Singers from West Bengal